Okřínek is a municipality and village in Nymburk District in the Central Bohemian Region of the Czech Republic. It has about 200 inhabitants.

Administrative parts
The village of Srbce is an administrative part of Okřínek.

References

Villages in Nymburk District